Neighbourhood Watch is a 2011 play by Alan Ayckbourn. The play premiered on 13 September 2011 at the Stephen Joseph Theatre in Scarborough.

Plot
The play centers around a brother and sister who innocently set up a Neighbourhood Watch group following petty crime from a nearby estate, only for the group to go out of control and become an authoritarian force controlling the lives of the people they are supposed to protect.

Reception
Critics were generally favourable with Michael Billington from The Guardian calling it "highly ambitious" and "biliously funny" while The Daily Telegraph and The Stage also gave it positive reviews.

A performance starring Paul Lavers was held at the Gordon Craig Theatre in Stevenage in May 2018.

References

External links 
 Neighbourhood Watch on official Ayckbourn site

2011 plays
Plays by Alan Ayckbourn